Narayana Institute of Cardiac Sciences (NICS) is a Joint Commission International and NABH-accredited hospital in Bommasandra, Bangalore, India, operated by the Narayana Health group. This super-speciality flagship cardiac hospital of Narayana Health is one of the largest in the world and is equipped with 23 dedicated cardiac operation theatres and five Digital Cath Labs, of which one is a Hybrid, capable of performing both interventional cardiac procedures as well as complex heart surgeries. 

The hospital was commissioned in 2000 as part of NH Health City, by Dr. Devi Prasad Shetty the Chairman and Founder of Narayana Health, who has performed nearly 15,000 heart surgeries. Its purpose as a centre was to focus on complex cardiac surgery and heart transplantation.

NICS is supplied with 23 cardiac operating theaters, five digital catheterisation laboratories including a hybrid catheterisation laboratory, and 200 critical care beds for post-operative care. NICS also has one of the largest pediatric intensive care units in the world. The hospital has performed free cardiac procedures for children and successfully treated heart problems on newborns, as well as adults, from several countries. NICS is capable of performing up to 60 heart surgeries per day. The cardiac procedures that are performed in NICS include: complex heart valve repair, coronary artery bypass graft, pulmonary endartectomy for chronic pulmonary embolism, the Ross procedure, ventricular aneurysm repair, left ventricular remodeling and Dor procedure, electrophysiology and left ventricular assist device (LVAD) implantation.

Awards and achievements 
 Best Single Speciality Hospital in India, Cardiology in the CNBC TV 18 & ICICI Lombard India Healthcare Award 2015–2016.
 First Artificial Heart Transplant in Asia

References

External links
Official Website

See also 
Narayana Health

Hospitals in Bangalore
Narayana Health
Hospitals established in 2000
2000 establishments in Karnataka